Rasbora bankanensis is a species of ray-finned fish in the genus Rasbora. It occurs in the Malay Peninsula and Indonesia and may be a complex of several species.

References 

Rasboras
Fish of Thailand
Taxa named by Pieter Bleeker
Fish described in 1853